In the West African Vodun religion, Sobo (alternative name: Grande Sobo) is a soldier-loa who rules over thunder.

Sobo is a spirit or loa in Haitian Vodou. He is the loa of thunder and is always depicted and served with his inseparable companion/brother Bade, who is the loa of wind. Together they are represented by the Catholic image of Saints Cosmas and Damian. He is probably West African in origin and a flaming ram is his symbol.

References

Haitian Vodou gods
Thunder gods